The 2007 Wear Valley District Council election took place on 3 May 2007 to elect members of Wear Valley District Council in England. This took place on the same day as other local elections across the UK.

All of the seats being contested were last contested in 2003.

	

	

		

	

	

	

		

	

2007 English local elections